Cardiff International may refer to:

 Cardiff International Academy of Voice
 Cardiff International Airport, now known as Cardiff Airport
 Cardiff International Arena, an event venue in Cardiff city centre
 Cardiff International Film Festival
 Cardiff International Sports Stadium, a stadium in Leckwith
 Cardiff International Sports Village
 Cardiff International Pool
 Cardiff International White Water